Bayuquan District is a district of the city of Yingkou, Liaoning province, People's Republic of China. This small city is known for its seafood like fish and crabs which are shipped to all parts of the world. This District is also a tourism spot in the summer.

Bayuquan is also the site of a large sea port for bulk carriers and container ships, administered along with the port of Yingkou, the latter lying to the north of Bayuquan new port.

Toponym 
The literal translation of the toponym is "Japanese Spanish mackerel arc". The local fishermen began to fish here since the early Qing dynasty, as the coast shaped like an arc and the coastal waters are rich in Japanese Spanish mackerel ("bayu" in Chinese), thus, the area is named after "Bayuquan".

Pollution 
In the recent years, the city of Bayuquan was affected by an iron mining company called An Gang. Some parts of the city is covered by smog which is affecting the tourism.

Administrative divisions
There are four subdistricts and three towns within the district.

Subdistricts:
Honghai Subdistrict
Haixing Subdistrict
Wanghai Subdistrict
Haidong Subdistrict

Towns:
Xiongyue
Lutun
Hongqi

Climate

References

External links

County-level divisions of Liaoning
Yingkou